Principles to Live By is the 16th novel by Canadian writer David Adams Richards, published in 2016.

The novel centres on John Delano, a Royal Canadian Mounted Police officer with a troubled personal life, who is investigating the cold case death of a young boy in 1999. 

The novel includes a scene in which Richards pokes fun at his own earlier novel Nights Below Station Street, with people in a local bar dismissing it as a "dirty, ignorant novel" that "nobody in their right mind would want to read".

References

2016 Canadian novels
Novels by David Adams Richards
Novels set in New Brunswick
Doubleday Canada books